Diocese of Bunbury could refer to:
Anglican Diocese of Bunbury
Roman Catholic Diocese of Bunbury